The 1960 United States presidential election in West Virginia took place on November 8, 1960, as part of the 1960 United States presidential election. West Virginia voters chose eight representatives, or electors, to the Electoral College, who voted for president and vice president.

 West Virginia was won by Senator John F. Kennedy (D–Massachusetts), running with Senator Lyndon B. Johnson, with 52.73 percent of the popular vote against incumbent Vice President Richard Nixon (R–California), running with United States Ambassador to the United Nations Henry Cabot Lodge, Jr., with 47.27 percent of the popular vote.

Results

Results by county

References

West Virginia
1960
1960 West Virginia elections